Rijnsburg Abbey was a Benedictine nunnery in Rijnsburg, Netherlands, active between 1133 until 1574.

History
It was founded by Petronilla of Lorraine, regent of Holland, in 1133 and was thereafter under the protection of the countesses of Holland. The abbey only accepted female members of the nobility as members. It became the most prestigious women's religious house in Holland and grew very wealthy on donations during the centuries.

On the basis of the handed down liturgical manuscripts it can be established that the Germanic liturgical practices were followed. 
There is almost no reason to assume that the abbey Rijnsburg or its mother house Stötterlingenburg in the Northern Harz have ever belonged to the order of Cluny.

It was pillaged and destroyed in 1574.   In the center of Rijnsburg, as part of the current church, only one of the two towers of the Romanesque abbey church remains.

Buried in the abbey of Rijnsburg 

 Ada van Holland from Rijnsburg, abbess
 Count Dirk VI
 Count William I
 Count Floris IV
 Count Floris V

See also
 List of abbesses
 Sint-Adelbert Abbey
 Abbey of Loosduinen

References

12th-century establishments in Europe
Christian monasteries established in the 12th century
1574 disestablishments
Nunneries in the Netherlands
Benedictine nunneries
Monasteries dissolved under the Dutch Reformation
Buildings and structures in South Holland
Burial sites of the House of Holland (nobility)
Burial sites of the House of Wassenberg